Quianna Nehma Chaney (born April 14, 1986) is an American professional basketball player who played for Botaş SK at the Turkish Women's Basketball League. Born in Baton Rouge, Louisiana, she played collegiately for LSU.

College career 
From 2004 to 2008, Chaney scored 1345 points for LSU, and was second in school history for three-pointers made and attempted. The Lady Tigers appeared in the NCAA Women's Final Four in all four years. As a Tiger Chaney was part of the 2005 SEC All-Freshman team, she was 2006 Academic All-SEC and 2007 Academic All-SEC, she was part of the 2007 Second-team All-SEC, the 2007 First-team All-Louisiana, the 2008 First-team All-SEC, and the 2008 First-team All-Louisiana. Her LSU teammates Erica White, and Sylvia Fowles also entered the WNBA Draft.

LSU statistics
Source

WNBA career 
In 2008 Chaney was drafted in the second round of the 2008 WNBA Draft with the 19th overall pick by the Chicago Sky. After one full season with Chicago, Chaney averaged 8.6 minutes and 2.4 points per game. She played 28 games in her rookie season. In 2009 Chaney played 14 minutes and scored 5 points in a preseason game against the Detroit Shock. This would be the last game Chaney would play with the Sky. She was later waived due to 11-woman roster cuts.

Overseas
She is currently playing for Botas SK in Turkey during the 211-12 WNBA off-season.

References

External links
Official Bio @ LSUSports.net
WNBA Player Profile

1986 births
Living people
American expatriate basketball people in Turkey
American women's basketball players
Basketball players from Baton Rouge, Louisiana
Botaş SK players
Chicago Sky draft picks
Chicago Sky players
LSU Lady Tigers basketball players
Shooting guards